This is a list of media in Grande Prairie, Alberta.

Radio

Television
CFRN-TV-1 channel 13 (CTV) is a local repeater of CFRN-DT Edmonton, with separate commercials and local news bulletins (with a local news gathering bureau) for Grande Prairie.

CBXT-DT (CBC Television), CBXFT-DT (Ici Radio-Canada Télé) and CITV-DT (Global) are also available on cable and satellite.

Print
Grande Prairie's main and only daily newspaper is the Grande Prairie Daily Herald-Tribune. The paper also publishes a regional agricultural supplement The Peace Country Sun. The DHT is owned by Canadian media conglomerate Sun Media, which is owned by Postmedia.

The Herald-Tribune publishes five days a week, Monday through Friday, and offers local news, sports and commentary, as well as national and international news. 

The newspaper, which was formed in 1913, became a daily newspaper in 1964, when the name of the paper became the "Daily" Herald-Tribune. It has not missed a scheduled publication, barring holidays, since it became a daily newspaper.

Other
Grande Prairie was host to one of the few video game development studios in Alberta, HermitWorks Entertainment. HermitWorks Entertainment was founded in 2004 and has gone on to release one title, Space Trader.

References

Grande Prairie

Media, Grande Prairie